Double Whammy may refer to:

Double Whammy (novel), a novel by Carl Hiaasen
Double Whammy (film), a 2001 film starring Denis Leary and Elizabeth Hurley